{{Infobox person
| name        = Aiden Turner
| image       = Aiden Turner.jpg
| caption     = Turner in  Agents of S.H.I.E.L.D.'
| birthname   = Aiden John Turner
| birth_date  = 
| birth_place = Welwyn Garden City, Hertfordshire, England.
From
 Stevenage, Hertfordshire. 
| occupation  = Actor
| partner     = Jessica Miller (2014–present)
| children    = 2
}}

Aiden John Turner (born 2 April 1977) is a British actor and model, probably best known for his role as Aidan Devane on All My Children and Brad Montgomery in the Prime Time Television series If Loving You Is Wrong. He has also guest starred in many television series, including Marvel's Agents of S.H.I.E.L.D.,Single LadiesNCIS Los Angeles, Satisfaction . In 2022 Turner starred opposite John Malkovich, Meliss Roxburgh and Martin Lawrence in a psychological thriller called Mindcage. He also invented TY, a loss prevention device using Bluetooth, that won best innovation in 2011 at the Consumer Electronics show in Las Vegas. 

Early years
Aiden Turner is from Stevenage, Hertfordshire, and attended local Catholic schools (St Joseph's, St Hugh's, and St Edmund's College, Ware).

Career
Turner is known for his role as Aidan Devane on All My Children, which he played from 6 June 2002 until he left AMC on 21 December 2009. He was nominated for an Emmy in 2003 for Outstanding Younger Actor in All My Children. He also appeared in Geri Halliwell's Bag It Up music video. Turner left the role of Aidan Devane in May 2004 during which time the role was recast with actor Tom Archdeacon. Turner returned to the show a few months later and portrayed Devane until Turner left AMC on 21 December 2009.

On 1 March 2010, it was announced that Turner would be a celebrity contestant on Dancing with the Stars for the tenth season. He was partnered with Edyta Sliwinska who competed in her tenth season. The season premiered on 22 March 2010. Aiden was eliminated at the end of week 4 of Season 10.

After All My Children, Turner guest-starred on Single Ladies, NCIS: Los Angeles and Agents of S.H.I.E.L.D.. In 2014, he was cast in the Oprah Winfrey Network series If Loving You Is Wrong.

Along with acting Turner has found a successful career in voiceover, modeling and commercial work.  He appeared in a CoverGirl'' commercial with Molly Sims. Aiden was also a model for Burberry, French Connection, Polo Ralph Lauren, among others and has appeared in commercials for Diet Coke, Head & Shoulders, Mercedes, Dodge Dart, Clorox, Chevrolet.  He was the voice of Jaguar for many years. The much loved horror movie Hunting Souls was just released on Apple TV and Amazon prime. This summer a movie called Mindcage is set to release this summer starring John Malkovitch, Martin Lawrence  Aiden Turner and Melissa Roxburgh.

Personal life
In 2015 Turner and girlfriend Jessica Miller announced that they were expecting their first child together, a son. They welcomed their baby boy Tristan Turner in October 2015.

Filmography

References

External links
Aiden Turner Official Website

1977 births
Living people
English male soap opera actors
English male film actors
People from Welwyn Garden City
Participants in American reality television series
People educated at St Edmund's College, Ware
Male actors from Hertfordshire
People from Stevenage